Penticton Regional Hospital (PRH) is a 140-bed hospital located in Penticton, British Columbia. It is operated by Interior Health and affiliated with UBC Faculty of Medicine. Penticton Regional Hospital was incorporated in 1913.

History 
In 2019,  a new hospital tower was opened as part of the first phase of a $320 million upgrade to the facility.

References

External links 
 

Hospital buildings completed in 1913
Hospitals in the Okanagan
Buildings and structures in Penticton
1913 establishments in British Columbia
Hospitals in British Columbia
Hospitals established in 1913
Heliports in Canada
Certified airports in British Columbia